Fuluo is a rural town in Xinhuang Dong Autonomous County, Hunan, China. It is surrounded by Yushi Town on the north, Liangsan Town on the west, Hetan Town and Zhongzhai Town on the east, and Gongxi Town on the south.

History
In April 2000 it was upgraded to a town. In December 2015, Xinzhai Township and Lishu Township were revoked. Some areas merged into the town.

Geography

The Pingxi Stream, a tributary of the Fuluo River, flows through the town.

The Chaoyang Reservoir is the largest body of water in the town.

Economy
he town's economy is based on nearby mineral resources and agricultural resources. The region abound with barite, iron, lead and zinc.

The total grain output of this town is over 5500 tons per year, ranking first in Xinhuang Dong Autonomous County. It is known as "Granary of Xinhuang".

Transportation
The Provincial Highway S232 passes across the town north to south.

References

Xinhuang